A gentlemen's club is a private social club of a type originally set up by men from Britain's upper classes in the 18th and succeeding centuries.

Many countries outside Britain have prominent gentlemen's clubs, mostly those associated with the British Empire, in particular, India, Pakistan, and Bangladesh. There are also many clubs in major American cities, especially the older ones. A gentleman's club typically contains a formal dining room, a bar, a library, a billiards room, and one or more parlours for reading, gaming, or socializing. Many clubs also contain guest rooms and fitness amenities. Some are associated mainly with sports and regularly hold other events such as formal dining.

History

The original clubs were established in the West End of London. Today, the area of St James's is still sometimes called "clubland". Clubs took over some parts of the role occupied by coffee houses in 18th-century London.  The first clubs, such as White's, Brooks's, and Boodle's, were aristocratic in flavour, and provided an environment for gambling, which was illegal outside of members-only establishments.

The 19th century brought an explosion in the popularity of clubs, particularly around the 1880s.  At the height of their influence in the late 19th century, London had over 400 such establishments.  

Club Life in London, an 1866 book, begins: "The Club in the general acceptation of the term, may be regarded as one of the earliest offshoots of man's habitual gregariousness and social inclination."

An increasing number of clubs were influenced by their members' interests in politics, literature, sport, art, automobiles, travel, particular countries, or some other pursuit. In other cases, the connection between the members was membership in the same branch of the armed forces, or the same school or university. Thus the growth of clubs gives some indication of what was considered a respectable part of the "Establishment" at the time.

By the late 19th century, any man with a credible claim to the status of "gentleman" was eventually able to find a club willing to admit him, unless his character was objectionable in some way or he was "unclubbable" (a word first used by Samuel Johnson). This newly expanded category of English society came to include professionals who had to earn their income, such as doctors and lawyers.

Most gentlemen belonged to only one club, which closely corresponded with the trade or social/political identity he felt most defined him, but a few people belonged to several. Members of the aristocracy and politicians were likely to have several clubs. The record number of memberships is believed to have been held by Earl Mountbatten, who had nineteen in the 1960s.

Public entertainments, such as musical performances and the like, were not a feature of this sort of club. The clubs were, in effect, "second homes" in the centre of London where men could relax, mix with their friends, play parlour games, get a meal, and in some clubs stay overnight. Expatriates, when staying in England, could use their clubs, as with the East India Club or the Oriental Club, as a base. They allowed upper- and upper-middle-class men with modest incomes to spend their time in grand surroundings. The richer clubs were built by the same architects as the finest country houses of the time and had similar types of interiors. They were a convenient retreat for men who wished to get away from female relations, "in keeping with the separate spheres ideology according to which the man dealt with the public world, whereas women's domain was the home." Many men spent much of their lives at their club, and it was common for young, newly graduated men who had moved to London for the first time to live at their club for two or three years before they could afford to rent a house or flat.

Gentleman's clubs were private places that were designed to allow men to relax and create friendships with other men. In the 19th and 20th centuries, clubs were regarded as a central part of elite men's lives. They provided everything a regular home would have. Clubs were created and designed for a man's domestic needs. They were places to relieve stress and worries. They provided for emotional and practical needs. They provided spaces such as dining halls, a library, entertainment and game rooms, bedrooms, bathrooms and washrooms, and a study. In many ways, they resembled a home. Clubs had separate entrances for tradesmen and servants, which were usually located on the side of the building that was not easily seen by the public eye. Many clubs had waiting lists, some as long as sixteen years. There is no standard definition for what is considered a gentlemen's club. Each club differed slightly from others.

In the 19th century, the family was considered one of the most important aspects of a man's life. A man's home was his property and should have been a place to satisfy most of his needs, but for elite men, this was not always the case; it was not always a place that provided privacy and comfort: perhaps because the homes of elite families often entertained guests for dinners, formal teas, entertainment, and parties. Their lives were on display, and often their lives would be reported in local papers. A gentleman's club offered an escape from this family world. Another explanation would be that men were brought up as boys in all-male environments in places like schools and sports pastimes, and they became uncomfortable when they had to share their lives with women in a family environment. A gentleman's club offered an escape.

Men's clubs were also a place for gossip. The clubs were designed for communication and the sharing of information. By gossiping, bonds were created which were used to confirm social and gender boundaries. Gossiping helped confirm a man's identity, both in his community and within society at large. It was often used as a tool to climb the social ladder. It revealed that a man had certain information others did not have. It was also a tool used to demonstrate a man's masculinity. It established certain gender roles. Men told stories and joked. The times and places a man told stories, gossiped, and shared information were also considered to show a man's awareness of behaviour and discretion. Clubs were places where men could gossip freely. Gossip was also a tool that led to more practical results in the outside world. There were also rules that governed gossip in the clubs. These rules governed the privacy and secrecy of members. Clubs regulated this form of communication so that it was done in a more acceptable manner.

Until the 1950s, clubs were also heavily regulated in the rooms open to non-members. Most clubs contained just one room where members could dine and entertain non-members; it was often assumed that one's entire social circle should be within the same club. Harold Macmillan was said to have taken "refuge in West End clubs ...: Pratt's, Athenaeum, Buck's, Guards, the Beefsteak, the Turf, [and] the Carlton".

The class requirements relaxed gradually throughout the 19th and 20th centuries. From the 1970s onwards, some single-sex clubs opened to both sexes as guests and as members, partly to maintain membership levels.

Domesticity 

Although Gentlemen's clubs were originally geared towards a male audience, domestic life played a key role in their establishment and continuity. Defying classic gender norms, the club could be represented as "homosocial domesticity." Similar to male coffeehouses of the Ottoman Empire, the clubs were a home away from home. It was an alternative, competing space in the sense that it had similar aspects to that of the traditional home. One of the key lures of these clubs was their private, often exclusive, nature. It was a getaway from the tight, restrictive role expected from the stoic gentleman. Like the home, men were granted the freedom to perform actions and behaviors not normally conveyed in their "public-oriented" lives.

With this newfound preference to spend time at clubs, the home lost its status as the base. Members would use this address for official documentation, mailing, and appointments. Meals, formal or informal, were provided and tastes could be catered for by the club staff. Spaces within the club were designated for these various functions, and the guest flow could be more easily controlled than at the home. Members’ social status was marked by the prestige of the club, but within, the lines were blurred. Prominent guests could be invited to dinner or to lounge at the club over the house. Staff would monitor these guests and their arrival for the members and, as employees of the member, could personally tailor the experience. Thus, by holding important events at the club, only the wealth and importance of the club and its amenities was displayed instead of their possibly inferior possessions or structures at home.

In English clubs, this domesticity was particularly emphasized. These clubs, primarily in London, were usually very "quiet" and its members were well-behaved—again pointing to the calm familiarity of the household. In addition, club staff were tasked with keeping the club a private space and attempted to control of the spread of information from the outside. Under no circumstance was the club to be depressing or too involved in the pains of reality. Whether from "the streets, the courts, Parliament, or the Stock Exchange," the chaotic nature of work life was put on hold. Young bachelors and other members were in many ways shielded from the true problems of society, especially female ones. While it was definitely an escape, it was not an escape from domesticity. Men knew and enjoyed the matching elements of the home life; it was more of a transfer or alternative reality.

Despite the opportunity for mobility within the club, secrecy and exclusivity supported the patriarchal authority. With the absence of female voices and set of rigid institutional structures, members created internal stability. Induction into a club required member approval and payment. Thus, a club was dependent on class and vice versa. Historian Robert Morris proposed that clubs were "part of the power nexus of capitalism, and essential to the continuity of elite dominance of society."

Women
Several private members clubs for women were established in the late 19th century; among them the Alexandra Club. and the self-consciously progressive Pioneer Club.

Women also set about establishing their own clubs in the late nineteenth century, such as the Ladies' Institute, and the Ladies' Athenaeum. They proved quite popular at the time, but only one London-based club, The University Women's Club, has survived to this day as a single-sex establishment.

Current status

Election to membership
Membership is by election after the proposers (at least two and in many clubs more), who have known the candidate for a term of years, formally nominate the person for membership. Election is by a special committee (itself elected), which may interview the candidate and which looks at any support and also objections of other members. Some top clubs still maintain distinctions which are often undefined and rarely explained to those who do not satisfy their membership requirements.  After reaching the top of a long waiting list, there is a possibility of being blackballed during the process of formal election by the committee. In these circumstances, the principal proposer of such a person may be expected to resign, as he failed to withdraw his undesirable candidate. More often, the member who proposes an unsuitable candidate will be "spoken to" at a much earlier stage than this, by senior committee members, and he will withdraw his candidate to avoid embarrassment for all concerned.

Ownership and governance
The clubs are owned by their members and not by an individual or corporate body. These kinds of relationships have been analyzed from the network analysis perspective by Maria Zozaya.

Worldwide distribution
Today, establishments based on the concept of the traditional gentlemen's clubs exist throughout the world, predominantly in Commonwealth countries and the United States. Many clubs offer reciprocal hospitality to other clubs' members when travelling abroad.

United Kingdom

There are perhaps some 25 traditional London gentlemen's clubs of particular note, from The Arts Club to White's. A few estimable clubs (such as the Royal Thames Yacht Club and the Royal Ocean Racing Club) have a specific character that places them outside the mainstream, while other clubs have sacrificed their individuality for the commercial purpose of attracting enough members, regardless of their common interests. (See article at club for a further discussion of these distinctions.) The oldest gentleman's club in London is White's, which was founded in 1693. Discussion of trade or business is usually not allowed in traditional gentlemen's clubs, although it may hire out its rooms to external organisations for events.

Similar clubs exist in other large UK cities, such as New Club in Edinburgh, The St James's Club in Manchester, The Cardiff and County Club in the capital of Wales, and the Ulster Reform Club in Belfast. The Liverpool Athenaeum was founded in 1797 by art collector and social reformer William Roscoe and friends, and contains a notable library of rare books. The Clifton Club in Bristol was founded in 1818 and occupies an imposing building. St Paul's Club was formed in 1859 in Birmingham, the first in the Midlands. Jersey and Guernsey in the Channel Islands, although outside the UK proper, each have their own The United Club, founded, respectively, in 1848 and in 1870.

In London, the original gentlemen's clubs exist alongside the late 20th century private members' clubs such the Groucho Club, Soho House and Home House, which offer memberships by subscription and are owned and run as commercial concerns. All offer similar facilities such as food, drink, comfortable surroundings, venue hire and in many cases accommodation. In recent years the advent of mobile working (using phone and email) has placed pressures on the traditional London clubs which frown on, and often ban, the use of mobiles and discourage laptops, indeed any discussion of business matters or 'work related papers'. A new breed of business-oriented private members' clubs, exemplified by One Alfred Place and Eight in London or the Gild in Barcelona, combines the style, food and drink of a contemporary private members' club with the business facilities of an office. It was for this reason that the Institute of Directors acquired one of the older clubhouses in Pall Mall as more business friendly.

Ireland 
Clubs in Ireland include two prominent Dublin social clubs, each having both male and female members, a range of facilities and events, and a wide network of reciprocal clubs: The Kildare Street and University Club (formed on the merger of Kildare Street Club (traditionally Conservative) with The Dublin University Club (academic)) and The St Stephen's Green Hibernian Club (similarly formed when the St Stephen's Green Club (Whig) merged with The Hibernian United Services Club (military)). A number of other, specialist clubs flourish in Dublin such as The United Arts Club, Royal Irish Academy, Royal Dublin Society, Yacht Clubs (The Royal Irish, The National, and The Royal St George) of Dún Laoghaire, The Hibernian Catch Club (catch music), and The Friendly Brothers of St Patrick (originally anti-duelling).

United States

Most major cities in the United States have at least one traditional gentlemen's club, many of which have reciprocal relationships with older clubs in London, with each other, and with other gentlemen's clubs around the world. In American English, the term "gentlemen's club" is commonly used euphemistically by strip clubs. As a result, traditional gentlemen's clubs often are called "men's clubs" or "city clubs" (as opposed to country clubs) or simply as "private social clubs" or "private clubs".

Christopher Doob explains in his book Social Inequality and Social Stratification in U.S. Society: 

E. Digby Baltzell, sociologist of the WASP establishment, explains in his book Philadelphia Gentlemen: The Making of a National Upper Class: 

The oldest existing American clubs date to the 18th century; the five oldest are the South River Club in Annapolis, Maryland (c.1690/1700), the Schuylkill Fishing Company in Andalusia, Pennsylvania (1732), the Old Colony Club in Plymouth, Massachusetts (1769), The Philadelphia Club (1834), and the Union Club of the City of New York (1836). The Boston Club of New Orleans, named after Boston (card game) and not the city, is the oldest southern club, and third oldest "city club," founded in 1841. The five oldest existing clubs west of the Mississippi River are the Pacific Club in Honolulu (1851), the Pacific-Union Club (1852), Olympic Club (1860), and Concordia-Argonaut Club (1864), all in San Francisco, and the Arlington Club in Portland, Oregon (1867).

Today, gentlemen's clubs in the United States remain more prevalent in older cities, especially those on the East Coast. Only twelve American cities have five or more existing clubs: Atlanta, Boston, Chicago, Cincinnati, Denver, Detroit, Los Angeles, New Orleans, New York City, Philadelphia, San Francisco, Seattle, and Washington, D.C. New York City contains more than any other American city. The Yale Club of New York City, comprising a clubhouse of 22 stories and a worldwide membership of over 11,000, is the largest traditional gentlemen's club in the world. Membership in the Yale Club is restricted to alumni, faculty, and full-time graduate students of Yale University, and the club has included women among its members since 1969.

Canada

At Montreal, the Beaver Club was founded in 1785. Every year, some of its members travelled back to England to sell their furs, where they established the Canada Club in 1810; it still meets twice yearly as a dining club. The Montreal Hunt Club, founded in 1826, is the oldest extant fox hunting club in North America. The Golden Square Mile is home to several of Montreal's clubs, including the St. James', which was founded in 1857. At the end of the nineteenth century, twenty of its most influential members felt that the St James was becoming 'too overcrowded' and founded the smaller Mount Royal Club in 1899. Overnight it became the city's most prestigious club, and in 1918, Lord Birkenhead commented that it "is one of the best clubs I know in the New World, with the indefinable atmosphere about it of a good London club". In 1908 the University Club, affiliated with McGill, opened. The Forest and Stream was formed by Frank Stephen and some of his gentlemen friends and associates on 27 November 1884 at a meeting held at the St. Lawrence Hall in Montreal. The club's original founders were Andrew Allan, James Bryce Allan, Hugh Montagu Allan, Louis Joseph Forget, Hartland St. Claire MacDougall, Hugh Paton, and Frank Stephen. It was formed with 15 shareholders and is still open today.

Quebec City has the Literary and Historical Society (1824), the Stadacona Club (1860), and the Garrison Club, founded by officers of the Canadian Militia and opened to the public in 1879.

The Toronto Club is the oldest in that city, founded in 1837. Others include National Club (1874), the Albany Club (1882), the York Club (1909), the University Club of Toronto, the Faculty Club associated with the University of Toronto, the Arts and Letters Club, and a number of other clubs. Other Ontario cities have their clubs: the Rideau Club (1865) at Ottawa; the Hamilton Club (1873); the Frontenac Club (1908) at Kingston, and The Waterloo Club (1913) by letters patent.

The Halifax Club was founded in 1862. The Union Club in Saint John, New Brunswick was founded in 1884 through the merger of two earlier clubs, and the Fredericton Garrison Club was founded in 1969 by associate members of the area headquarters officers' mess.

The Manitoba Club is Western Canada's oldest club, founded in 1874 at Winnipeg. The Union Club of British Columbia was founded in 1879 in Victoria. The Vancouver Club was founded in 1889.

Australia
Australia has a number of gentlemen's clubs. Of those listed below, the Commonwealth Club, the Kelvin Club, the Newcastle Club, the Royal Automobile Club, the Tattersalls Club in Sydney and the Union, University and Schools Club allow women to enjoy full membership.

New South Wales
Sydney has the Australian Club, the Royal Automobile Club of Australia, the Tattersalls Club and the Union, University & Schools Club. The City Tattersalls Club, which named itself after the Tattersalls Club, no longer has exclusive membership criteria.

Newcastle has the Newcastle Club.

Victoria
Melbourne has the Melbourne Club, the Alexandra Club, the Athenaeum Club (named after its counterpart in London), the Australian Club (unrelated to the identically-named club in Sydney), the Kelvin Club and the Savage Club.

Geelong has The Geelong Club.

Queensland
Brisbane has the Queensland Club, the Brisbane Club, United Services Club and the Tattersalls Club (unrelated to the identically-named club in Sydney).

South Australia
Adelaide has the Adelaide Club and the Naval, Military and Air Force Club of South Australia.

Western Australia
Perth has the Western Australian Club and the Weld Club.

Tasmania
Hobart has the Tasmania Club and the Athenaeum Club.

Australian Capital Territory
Canberra has the Commonwealth Club.

France
The English Club of Pau, France chartered by an Anglo-American winter colony in 1856 is now named the Cercle Anglais.

India

Bangladesh
 Dhaka Club
  Chittagong Club
 Narayanganj Club Ltd

Pakistan
Numerous gentlemen's clubs were established in modern-day Pakistan before Indian independence and partition. These clubs included the Sind Club, founded in Karachi in 1871; the Karachi Club, founded in the same city in 1907. At one point the city was also home to the Hindu Gymkhana, which was established for the merchant class in Karachi, but that 1925 the building was no longer a gentleman's club. Gentlemen's clubs in Pakistan during the colonial era restricted membership to Europeans only, with the Sind Club at one point hanging a sign outside the door stating "Dogs and Locals not allowed". Most pre-partition clubs in Pakistan have divested themselves from exclusivity and started the concept of offering membership in return for payment. These include Karachi Club, Karachi Gymkhana, and Karachi Yacht Club. However; some have retained exclusivity and membership on an invite only or referral basis. These include Sind Club, Karachi Boat Club, and Karachi Golf Club.

South Africa
South Africa is home to the Rand Club in downtown Johannesburg, the Wanderers Club in Illovo, Johannesburg as well as the Inanda Club in Sandton and the Johannesburg Country Club. In Cape Town there is the spacious Kelvin Grove Club, the Cape Town Club and the Owl Club. In Durban is the Durban Club, founded in 1852, and the Kimberley Club in Kimberley, founded in 1881.

South America

Lima (Peru) has several traditional gentlemen clubs still functioning such as the Club Nacional (Peru) (1855), Club de la Unión (1868),  (1879), and the Club de la Banca y Comercio (1951).

Buenos Aires (Argentina) is home to the Club del Progreso (1852; the oldest gentlemen's club in South America), the Jockey Club (1882) founded by Carlos Pellegrini, and the Club Universitario de Buenos Aires (1918). The Club 20 de Febrero was founded (1858) by General Rudecindo Alvarado in the city of Salta. The name is in honor of the Battle of Salta on 20 February 1813, during the Argentine War of Independence.

Santiago (Chile) houses the Club de la Unión (1854), originally a rich men's only club. Viña del Mar has the Club de Viña del Mar (1901).

Spain
Clubs in Spain (called Casinos or Círculos culturales in Spanish) emerged in the beginning of the 19th century, during the political transition between the old regime and the constitutional liberalism. They are open only to their members, initially the bourgeoisie and the upper classes. By 1882 there was 1.552 casinos in Spain, according to the Ministry of the Interior. Today there are casinos culturales on the main cities of Spain, that promote civic, cultural, artistic, and recreational activities. Some cities even have more than one club due to their origins. For example, in Seville there are three clubs, one that originally restricted admission to businessmen and industrialists, another one to landowners, and another one to renowned scientists, writers and artists. The Spanish Federation of Gentlemen's clubs (Federación Española de Círculos y Casinos Culturales), founded in 1928, coordinates and defends the interests of the most important clubs in Spain.

Sweden
Clubs in Sweden include Sällskapet ('The Society') (1800), the military club Militärsällskapet (1852), Nya Sällskapet ('The New Society') (1874) in Stockholm and the Royal Bachelors' Club (1769) in Gothenburg

New Zealand
There are active gentlemen's clubs in Nelson (Hope), Auckland, Hastings, Wellington, Christchurch and Dunedin.

Japan 
In 1884, the Tokyo Club was founded in line with the principles of the Meiji era as a British-style gentlemen's club; the original membership included leading Japanese politicians, functionaries, and men of finance, as well as foreign ambassadors and representatives. Originally located in the Rokumeikan, a dedicated clubhouse was built in 1897 in Shinbashi, to be replaced by a newer clubhouse in 1912 in Kasumigaseki. Since 2005 it has been situated in Roppongi; its current Patron is Masahito, Prince Hitachi.

Like the Tokyo Club, the Kasumi Kaikan was previously located in the Rokumeikan, and now continues on its own modern premises as a club of the former kazoku nobility with strict membership rules. Although it possesses many characteristics of a gentlemen's club, membership is open to women.

Hong Kong
The Hong Kong Club

Thailand
The most prestigious active gentlemen's club in Thailand is the Royal Bangkok Sports Club, one of the oldest sporting institutions in Thailand, with construction personally funded by King Rama V.

Singapore 
Tanglin Club

Quirks of membership
While many clubs have requirements of entry, often including financial requirements or collegiate affiliations – The Yale Club and Penn Club of New York City are typical of university clubs: they are open to all who have a connection with their respective universities (in this case Yale University or the University of Pennsylvania) – some clubs have highly specific membership requirements.

The Caledonian Club in London requires "being of direct Scottish descent, that is to say, tracing descent from a Scottish father or mother, grandfather or grandmother" or "having, in the opinion of the Committee, the closest association with Scotland."

The Travellers Club, from its foundation in 1819, has excluded from membership anyone who has not met a very specific travelling requirement. Rule 6 of the club's constitution states that "no person be considered eligible to the Travellers' Club, who shall not have travelled out of the British islands to a distance of at least 500 miles from London in a direct line".

The Reform Club requires its potential members to attest that they would have supported the 1832 Reform Act, whilst certain members of the East India Club must have attended one of its affiliated public schools.

Clubs also require membership fees, which, along with the ongoing cost of meeting their dress codes and the cost of bar tabs and dining bills, tends to impose a financial barrier for existing and would-be members. Most clubs have favourable subscription fees for younger members.

See also
 List of American gentlemen's clubs
 List of India's gentlemen's clubs
 List of London's gentlemen's clubs
 Fraternity
 Fraternal order
 Social club
 Country club
 Dining club

References

Further reading